George Gordon (September 2, 1906 – May 24, 1986) was an American film and TV animator and director of animated productions. Starting in film in 1930, he moved to TV in its early days. Gordon is credited with hundreds of cartoons from 1937 through 1983.

Biography 
Gordon began working with animation in 1930 at the Terrytoons Studio as an animator on the Jesse and James and Farmer Al Falfa Cartoons.

In 1937, Gordon left Terrytoons for the Metro-Goldwyn-Mayer cartoon studio to work as an animator. During his career at MGM, he directed Barney Bear shorts and animated for Tom and Jerry. Gordon was later promoted to the director position on animations such as:
A Bully Frog (1936)
The Busy Bee (1936)
Robin Hood in an Arrow Escape (1936)
Farmer Al Falfa
Kiko the Kangaroo
Puddy the Pup

After departing MGM, Gordon found employment at John Sutherland Productions. While there, he directed the animated short The Trainer Within. The film was preserved at the United States National Library of Medicine as of 1988. He supervised stories for the UPA cartoon Mr. Magoo. By the 1960s Gordon served as director for DePatie-Freleng's The Ant and the Aardvark series of shorts. 

Gordon spent his final years at Hanna-Barbera, where he directed various episodes of The Kwicky Koala Show, Trollkins and The New Scooby and Scrappy-Doo Show.

George's older brother, Dan Gordon, worked for Hanna-Barbera as well. He had a daughter named Sally Lucas.

Works 
Scooby-Doo
Scrappy-Doo
Casper and the Angels
The Little Rascals
 Super Friends for Hanna-Barbera Productions
Barney Bear
Tom and Jerry series

References

External links 
 

1906 births
1986 deaths
American animators
American animated film directors
American film directors
Hanna-Barbera people
Terrytoons people
Metro-Goldwyn-Mayer cartoon studio people